The 1993–94 Hellenic Football League season was the 41st in the history of the Hellenic Football League, a football competition in England.

Premier Division

The Premier Division featured 16 clubs which competed in the division last season, along with two new clubs, promoted from Division One:
North Leigh
Tuffley Rovers

Also, Almondsbury Picksons changed name to Almondsbury Town.

League table

Division One

Division One featured 13 clubs which competed in the division last season, along with five new clubs.
Clubs, relegated from the Premier Division:
Didcot Town
Pegasus Juniors
Plus:
Ardley United, joined from the Oxfordshire Senior League
Hallen, joined from the Gloucestershire County League
Letcombe, joined from the Chiltonian League

League table

References

External links
 Hellenic Football League

1993-94
8